Dumbarton Football Club is a semi-professional football club in Dumbarton, Scotland. Founded on 23 December 1872, they are one of the oldest football clubs in Scotland.

The club plays home games at the Dumbarton Football Stadium next to Dumbarton Castle.

They were one of the most successful of the nineteenth century, winning the Scottish Football League in the first two seasons of the competition (the first jointly with Rangers).

The club ceased playing in 1901 and did not return to action until 1905. Although at the time it was emphasised that this was a new club, subsequent directives by the SFA and Scottish Combination appear to countermand this, possibly to fast-track the re-formed club into their competitions. 

Since then, the club have spent the majority of their history outside the top flight, with their last appearance at the top level coming in 1984–85 and the side currently playing in Scottish League Two. The club were the first team (and one of only two) to win at least one league title in each of the top four tiers in the Scottish football league system.

Stephen Farrell is the club's manager, having been appointed in May 2021.

In May 2021, it was announced that Dumbarton were to change ownership, with previous owners Brabco selling their majority share to Cognitive Capital.

Colours and badge
For 2022–23, the side will wear strips from the Macron brand for the first season. After three seasons playing in predominantly yellow the home strip is mainly white with a black and gold band. The away kit is navy blue and white.

The club's badge features an elephant with a castle on its back, this represents Dumbarton Rock with Dumbarton Castle upon it, based on the historic town crest. Dumbarton Rock, a volcanic plug, is said to resemble an elephant. The team's nickname 'The Sons' is derived from the phrase 'Sons of The Rock', a term used for those born in the town of Dumbarton.

Stadium

Dumbarton play their home games at Dumbarton Football Stadium (commonly referred to as "The Rock" by supporters). The  all seated stadium has been used since 2 December 2000. The only stand is overshadowed by Dumbarton Rock & sits aside the banks of the River Leven. The stadium has been named for sponsorship purposes for most of its existence:

 Strathclyde Homes Stadium (Dec 2000 – Sep 2011) until the receivership of Strathclyde Homes
 Dumbarton Football Stadium (Sep 2011 – Feb 2012)
 Dumbarton Football Stadium Sponsored by DL Cameron (Feb 2012 – Jul 2012)
 The BetButler Stadium (Jul 2012 – Sep 2014) until the liquidation of BetButler
 Dumbarton Football Stadium (Sep 2014 – Jun 2015)
 The Cheaper Insurance Direct Stadium (Jul 2015 – May 2017)
 The YOUR Radio 103FM Stadium (July 2017 – May 2018)
 C&G Systems Stadium (May 2018 – May 2021)
Dumbarton Football Stadium (May 2021 – September 2021)
Moreroom.com Stadium (September 2021 – present)

Prior to December 2000, the team played at Boghead Park from 1879 until the end of the 1999–00 season; at that time their tenure of 121 years was the longest a senior Scottish club had stayed at the same ground. Between May and November 2000, Dumbarton shared Cliftonhill in Coatbridge with Albion Rovers.

In November 2014 the club's owners, Brabco, formally announced their intention to move to a new ground after only 15 years at their home, situated in what is Young's Farm to the North of Dumbarton between Dalreoch and Renton. The proposed development would have doubled the existing capacity to 4,000, with the existing site being used to build 180 houses and a walkway along the River Clyde connecting the town centre with Dumbarton Castle. The plans were rejected by West Dunbartonshire Council in March 2018.

Attendances

Supporters and culture

Dumbarton were the first league club in Scotland to have a supporters' trust, which works to strengthen the links between the club and the fans. The trust own a significant number of shares in the club and are the fourth largest shareholder. Following a £25,000 direct investment, the trust also has a representative on the club board of directors. The supporters' trust works with the club to produce the match programme & run the club website. As well as those important functions, the trust's main role at the club is that of overseeing commercial activity.

One of the main ways supporters back the club financially is by playing the club's weekly lottery. Launched in association with Our Club Lotto by supporters trust board member Stephanie Park in 2020, fans of the club have raised thousands of pounds through their entries. Draws to win up to £10,000 take place every Wednesday night with all profits reinvested into the running of the football club.

Players

Squad

On loan

Hall of Fame
Recently, the club and its fans named their "best player of all time" and a "Hall of Fame" including:

 Lawrie Williams – 372 apps (1970–1980)
 Ray Montgomerie – 180 apps (1981–1988)
 Murdo MacLeod – 87 apps (1975–1978) and 66 apps (1993–1995) as Player/Manager
 Donald McNeil – 320 apps (1975–1988)
 Colin McAdam – 70 apps (1969–1975)
 Albert Craig – 138 apps (1981–1986)
 Tom McAdam – 76 apps (1970–1975)
 Johnny Graham – 385 apps (1967–1977)
 William Wallace – 84 apps (1972–1975)
 Kenny Wilson – 74 apps (1970–1972)
 Charlie Gibson – 257 apps (1989–1996)

Internationals
18 Dumbarton players were chosen to represent Scotland between 1880 and 1898. The club's international players were as follows:

 Ralph Aitken
 Jack Bell
 Robert 'Sparrow' Brown
 Robert 'Plumber' Brown
 Geordie Dewar
 Leitch Keir
 Archie Lang
 Joe Lindsay
 James McAulay
 William McKinnon

 John McLeod
 Thomas McMillan
 Peter Miller
 William Robertson
 Duncan Stewart
 Jack Taylor
 William Thomson
 Hugh Wilson

Coaching staff

Recent league history

Managerial history
Manager records for all league, league play-offs, League Cup, Scottish Cup & Challenge Cup games (i.e. not including friendlies & Stirlingshire Cup games)

 Permanent managers only. Stats include permanent managers who had initial caretaker spells.

As of match played 11 February 2023:

Honours

League
 Scottish Football League: Winners 1890–91, 1891–92
 Scottish First Division: Winners 1910–11, 1971–72
Runners-up 1907–08, 1983–84
 Scottish Second Division: Winners 1991–92
 Runners-up 1994–95
 Play-Off Winners 2011–12
 Scottish Third Division: Winners 2008–09
Runners-up 2001–02
 Scottish Combination League: Winners 1905–06

Cup

National
 Scottish Cup: Winners 1882–83
 Runners-up 1880–81, 1881–82, 1886–87, 1890–91, 1896–97
 Scottish Challenge Cup: Runners-up 2017–18 
 Scottish Qualifying Cup: Runners-up 1911–12
 Scottish Consolation Cup: Runners-up 1907–08, 1910–11
 Scottish Supplementary Cup: Runners-up 1945–46
 Festival of Britain St. Mungo Quaich: Winners 1951–52

Other
 Stirlingshire Cup: Winners (16) 1952–53, 1956–57, 1964–65, 1972–73, 1974–75, 1980–81, 1982–83, 1985–86, 1987–88, 1989–90, 1990–91, 1993–94, 1995–96, 2009–10, 2010–11, 2012–13
Runners-up 6 times
 Dumbartonshire Cup: Winners (20) 1884–85 1888–89, 1889–90, 1890–91, 1891–92, 1892–93, 1893–94, 1894–95, 1897–98, 1898–99, 1914–15, 1921–22, 1922–23, 1929–30, 1930–31, 1931–32, 1932–33, 1935–36, 1936–37, 1939–40
 Runners-up 17 times 
 Dumbartonshire Association Tournament: Winners 1885–86
 Stirlingshire Consolation Cup: Runners-up 1950–51
 League Charity Cup: Winners 1890–91
 Glasgow Charity Cup: Runners-up 1881–82, 1884–85
 Greenock Charity Cup: Winners 1889–90, 1890–91
 Runners-up 1888–89, 1891–92
 Dumbartonshire Charity Cup:
 Winners 1916–17, 1917–18, 1919–20, 1921–22, 1922–23
 Runners-up 1918–19, 1924–25, 1925–26
 Clydebank Charity Cup: Runners-up 1918–19
 United Abstainers F.C. Gold Cup: Runners-up 1889–90
 Oban Saints Keyline Trophy: Winners 2005–06

Reserves
 Scottish Second XI Cup: Winners 1881–82
 Runners-up 1883–84, 1886–87, 1889–90
 Glasgow & District Reserve League: Runners-up 1942–43 (First Series), 1943–44 (First Series)
 Scottish Alliance Reserve League: Winners 1956–57 (First Series)
 Runners-up: 1956–57 (Second Series)
 Combined Reserve League: Winners 1958–59 (Second Series)
 Runners-up: 1958–59 (First Series)
 Scottish Reserve League (West): Runners-up 1985–86
 Glasgow & District Reserve League Cup: Runners-up 1942–43
 Dumbartonshire Second XI Cup: Winners 1888–89, 1889–90, 1890–91, 1891–92, 1892–93

Youths
 Scottish Under 19s League: Runners-up 2010–11

Club records
Biggest win:
Scottish Cup: 13–2 v Kirkintilloch Central (1 September 1888)

Biggest loss:
Scottish Football League: 1–11 v Albion Rovers (30 January 1926)
Scottish League Cup: 1–11 v Ayr United (13 August 1952)

Biggest home attendance:
Boghead Park: 18,001 v Raith Rovers, (2 March 1957)
Dumbarton Football Stadium: 1,978 v Rangers, (19 September 2015)

Most goals in a season: Kenny Wilson (38), 1971–72

References

External links
 
 Supporters Trust Website

 
Dumbarton
Football clubs in Scotland
Football in West Dunbartonshire
Association football clubs established in 1872
Scottish Football League teams
Scottish Football League founder members
1872 establishments in Scotland
Scottish Cup winners
Scottish Professional Football League teams